The  is a professional wrestling tournament held by All Japan Pro Wrestling (AJPW). The tournament is also known by the nickname  and is sometimes abbreviated to CC. Created by AJPW founder Giant Baba, the tournament has been held annually since 1973 and is the longest-running singles tournament in professional wrestling, while also ranking as the most prestigious event in the AJPW calendar. It is considered a successor to the World League, held by Japan Pro Wrestling Alliance (JWA) between 1959 and 1972, predating the New Japan Pro-Wrestling (NJPW) G1 Climax tournament by a year.

The tournament is held in a round-robin format, where all participating wrestlers face each other once with the winner being awarded two points and the loser none. A draw results in both wrestlers being awarded a point. After all wrestlers have faced each other once, the top two wrestlers advance to the final to determine the tournament winner.

Baba himself holds the record for most Champion Carnival wins, having won the tournament seven times. Other notable winners include Abdullah the Butcher, Jumbo Tsuruta, Keiji Mutoh, Mitsuharu Misawa, Stan Hansen and Toshiaki Kawada. Four wrestlers have won both the Champion Carnival and the G1 Climax: Mutoh, Satoshi Kojima,  Kensuke Sasaki and Yuji Nagata, with Kojima the only one to win them along side Fire Festival and Nagata the only one to win them along side the  Global League.

History

From 1959 to 1972, the Japan Pro Wrestling Alliance (JWA), run by Rikidōzan, held a tournament called World League (also known as the "World Big League"), which featured both Japanese and foreign professional wrestlers. Rikidōzan himself dominated the annual tournament early on, however, after his death in 1963, the tournament was won six times by Giant Baba and once by Antonio Inoki. JWA folded shortly after both Baba and Inoki left the promotion to create All Japan Pro Wrestling (AJPW) and New Japan Pro-Wrestling (NJPW), respectively. Both men took the concept of World League with them to their new promotions, with Baba creating the "Champion Carnival" in 1973 and Inoki creating the World League in 1974, later renaming it G1 Climax.

The first Champion Carnival took place only six months after Baba had founded AJPW. The initial tournament was held in a single-elimination format and was intended for AJPW's heavyweight wrestlers such as Hiro Matsuda, Samson Kutsuwada and Thunder Sugiyama. For the tournament, Baba also recruited several foreign wrestlers, such as Baron Scicluna, The Destroyer, King Curtis Iaukea and Mark Lewin. Baba himself won the inaugural tournament, defeating Lewin in the final. A year later, AJPW presented the second Champion Carnival, which most notably introduced former Olympian Jumbo Tsuruta, who eventually went on to become one of the promotion's top names. Baba also won the second Champion Carnival, this time defeating Mr. Wrestling in the final. Heading into the 1975 Champion Carnival, Baba changed the tournament's format. Now the four wrestlers who advanced to the semifinals in the single-elimination tournament were put into a round-robin tournament, where the wrestler with the best record would be declared the winner. Baba went on to win the tournament for the third year in a row, defeating Gene Kiniski in the final. A year later, the single-elimination portion of the tournament was eliminated and the Champion Carnival was changed to a pure round-robin tournament, a format it holds to this day. The 1976 tournament was the first Champion Carnival not won by Baba. It was instead won by Canadian Abdullah the Butcher, who defeated Baba in the final. Baba went on to win the tournament four more times, winning a total of seven out of the ten first Champion Carnivals. In early 1980s, AJPW loaded the Champion Carnival with some of the top foreign wrestlers in the world, including Billy Robinson, Bruiser Brody, Dick Slater, Jack Brisco, Stan Hansen, Ted DiBiase and Terry Funk. However, after rival promotion NJPW took over as the number one promotion in Japan with a record-breaking business streak, AJPW decided to put the Champion Carnival on hiatus, not wanting the tournament to be overshadowed by their competitors. The hiatus lasted from 1983 to 1991.

In 1991, AJPW had overtaken NJPW and was again the top promotion in Japan, boasting a roster of top foreign wrestlers mixed with top Japanese wrestlers. The 1991 tournament showcased several younger wrestlers, including Kenta Kobashi, Mitsuharu Misawa and Toshiaki Kawada, who bypassed the promotion's aging veterans and went on to become the promotion's cornerstones for the next decade. However, despite the emergence of the younger wrestlers and the participation of foreign wrestlers such as Doug Furnas, The Dynamite Kid, Johnny Ace, Johnny Smith and Mick Foley, the 1991 tournament was won by an AJPW veteran Jumbo Tsuruta, who defeated Stan Hansen in the final. The 1992 tournament was booked around the storyline of the "young lions" challenging the veterans for AJPW supremacy. Stan Hansen went on to win his first Champion Carnival, defeating Mitsuharu Misawa in the final. Despite losing in the final, the tournament made Misawa a star, someone earmarked to occupy the promotion's top spot. A year later, Hansen again defeated Misawa in the final. The 1993 tournament was also noteworthy for introducing rookie Jun Akiyama. In 1994, Toshiaki Kawada became the first of the "young lions" to win the Champion Carnival, defeating "Dr. Death" Steve Williams in the final, a match that has been called "arguably the greatest Carnival tournament match of all time". For the next several years the tournament was dominated by AJPW's younger wrestlers with Kawada repeating his win, Mitsuharu Misawa winning two tournaments and Kenta Kobashi one tournament. The 1997 tournament ended in a rare three-way draw between Kawada, Kobashi and Misawa, resulting in a round-robin playoff between the three, where Kawada emerged victorious.

On January 31, 1999, Giant Baba died, leaving the promotion in the hands of Mitsuharu Misawa. The 1999 Champion Carnival was the first one not booked by Baba. As the new booker, Misawa made a controversial decision to leave Stan Hansen out of the tournament, while giving Vader the win in the final over Kenta Kobashi. Problems between Misawa and Giant Baba's widow Motoko Baba led to Misawa exiting AJPW in 2000, taking 26 out of the 28 Japanese AJPW wrestlers with him to form the new Pro Wrestling Noah promotion. Struggling to cope with the loss of the majority of its roster, AJPW eventually hired NJPW wrestler Keiji Mutoh to lead the promotion. Mutoh went on to win the Champion Carnival three times (2002, 2004 and 2007), before leaving the promotion in 2013, after which he was replaced by Jun Akiyama. 2013 also saw Akiyama finally win his first Champion Carnival, twenty years after his debut appearance in the tournament.

In recent years, several outsiders have won the tournament, with freelancer Minoru Suzuki winning it in 2009 and 2010, NJPW representative Yuji Nagata winning it in 2011, Big Japan Pro Wrestling (BJW) representative Daisuke Sekimoto winning it in 2016, freelancer Shuji Ishikawa winning it in 2017, and Pro Wrestling Noah representative Naomichi Marufuji winning it in 2018.

On April 2, 2020, AJPW held a press conference, delaying this year's Champion Carnival, due to the COVID-19 pandemic. On May 28, they confirmed that the tournament has been moved to September.

List of winners

1973
The 1973 Champion Carnival is the first edition of the Champion Carnival. It took place from March 17 to April 21, featuring 15 wrestlers in a single-elimination format. Giant Baba received a first-round bye, and was the inaugural winner of the tournament.

1This match originally ended in a no-contest on April 10th, so a rematch was scheduled for April 14th to determine the 1st finalist with Mark Lewin winning.
2The finals were contested under best of 3 falls rules, with Baba winning the first fall at 12:49 and Lewin winning the second fall at 16:55. Baba won the third and decisive fall at 19:20, thus becoming the inaugural Champion Carnival winner.

1978
The 1978 Champion Carnival took place from March 4 to April 7, featuring 15 wrestlers in a round-robin format. The tournament was won by Giant Baba, who defeated Abdullah the Butcher via countout in the finals. It was Baba's fifth tournament win.

1979
The 1979 Champion Carnival took place from March 3 to April 6, featuring 16 wrestlers in a round-robin format. The tournament was won by Abdullah the Butcher, who defeated Jumbo Tsuruta in the second of two playoff matches after both men tied atop the standings. The first playoff match resulted in a double-countout, and a second match was held.

Playoff matches:
Abdullah the Butcher vs. Jumbo Tsuruta ended in a double-countout (13:14)
Abdullah the Butcher defeated Jumbo Tsuruta (2:11)

1980
The 1980 Champion Carnival took place from March 28 to May 1, featuring 13 wrestlers in a round-robin format. The tournament was won by Jumbo Tsuruta, who defeated Dick Slater in the final.

1981
The 1981 Champion Carnival took place from March 27 to April 23, featuring 14 wrestlers in a round-robin format. Giant Baba won the tournament for the sixth time.

1982
The 1982 Champion Carnival took place from March 23 to April 18, featuring 18 wrestlers in a round-robin format. Giant Baba won the tournament for the seventh time.

1991
The 1991 Champion Carnival took place from March 23 to April 18, featuring 14 wrestlers participating in a two-block round-robin format. The two wrestlers who finished atop each block met in the final.

Jumbo Tsuruta, the reigning Triple Crown Heavyweight Champion, defeated Stan Hansen in the final.

1992
The 1992 Champion Carnival took place from March 20 to April 17, featuring 20 wrestlers participating in a two-block round-robin format. The two wrestlers who finished atop each block met in the final.

Stan Hansen, the reigning Triple Crown Heavyweight Champion, defeated Mitsuharu Misawa in the final.

1993
The 1993 Champion Carnival took place from March 25 to April 21, featuring 13 wrestlers participating in a single-block round-robin format. Stan Hansen repeated as tournament champion, a feat that had only been achieved by Giant Baba.

Jun Akiyama suffered an arm injury in a tag team match on the first event of the tournament, partnered with Takao Omori against Satoru Asako and Masao Inoue (their first match as a team). Akiyama was unable to participate in the tournament as a result.

1994
The 1994 Champion Carnival took place from March 19 to April 16, featuring 12 wrestlers participating in a single-block round-robin format. Toshiaki Kawada won the tournament in his fourth appearance.

1995
The 1995 Champion Carnival took place from March 21 to April 15, featuring 11 wrestlers participating in a single-block round-robin format. Mitsuharu Misawa won the tournament.

There were originally 12 wrestlers scheduled for the tournament, but that number dropped to 11 on March 22 when Steve Williams was suspended from AJPW for one year after being found in possession of painkillers at the airport and returned to the United States.

1996
The 1996 Champion Carnival took place from March 22 to April 20, featuring 12 wrestlers in a single-block round-robin format. Akira Taue, one-half of the reigning AJPW World Tag Team Champions, won the tournament, after having fallen to Mitsuharu Misawa in the 1995 final.

1997
The 1997 Champion Carnival was held from March 22 to April 19, featuring 13 wrestlers in a single-block round-robin format. Due to a three-way tie for first place between Toshiaki Kawada, Kenta Kobashi and Mitsuharu Misawa, a one-night round-robin playoff was contested among them with the winner claiming the tournament.

1998
The 1998 Champion Carnival was held from March 21 to April 18, featuring 13 wrestlers in a single-block round-robin format, with the top two finishers wrestling in the final.

Mitsuharu Misawa, reigning Triple Crown Heavyweight Champion, won the tournament for the second time, also having won in 1995.

1999
The 1999 Champion Carnival was held from March 24 to April 16, featuring 10 wrestlers in a single-block round-robin format, with the top two finishers wrestling in the final.

Vader, reigning Triple Crown Heavyweight Champion, won the tournament in his first appearance.

2000
The 2000 Champion Carnival was held from March 24 to April 15, featuring 16 wrestlers in a single-elimination format.

Kenta Kobashi, reigning Triple Crown Heavyweight Champion, won the tournament in his 10th consecutive appearance.

2001
The 2001 Champion Carnival was held from March 23 to April 11, featuring 10 wrestlers in a single-block round-robin format, with the top two finishers wrestling in the final.

Genichiro Tenryu, reigning Triple Crown Heavyweight Champion, won the tournament in his second appearance, his first since 1982.

2002
The 2002 Champion Carnival was held from March 23 to April 10, re-introduced the dual-block round-robin format used in 1991 and 1992, this time with 7 men in each block; the top two scorers in each would advance to a four-man tournament, with Block A's first place finalist facing Block B's runner-up, and vice versa, and the winners wrestling in the final. Despite the Triple Crown Heavyweight Championship being vacant as a result of Toshiaki Kawada injuring his knee after his match against Arashi (thereby forfeiting all his other scheduled matches), All Japan decided not to use the tournament to fill the vacancy, citing the time limit for tournament matches (30 minutes as opposed to 60 in championship bouts).

The winner, Keiji Mutoh, became the first man in history to win both the Champion Carnival and the G1 Climax, as well as the second man (after Vader) to win the Carnival in his first appearance.

2003

The 2003 version of the Champion Carnival took place between March 22 and March 28. Keiji Mutoh, Satoshi Kojima, George Hines, Johnny Smith, Arashi and Nobutaka Araya received byes to the quarterfinals, leaving Yoji Anjo, Gigantes, The Gladiator and Big John Tenta to fight in the first round. Shinya Hashimoto, reigning Triple Crown Heavyweight Champion, did not participate, citing prior commitments to his Pro Wrestling Zero1 promotion.

2004

The 2004 version of the Champion Carnival took between April 10 and April 20.

2005

The 2005 version of the Champion Carnival took place between April 9 and April 20. Kensuke Sasaki, the winner of this edition, was the second man to win both Champion Carnival and G1 Climax tournaments, the first man being Keiji Mutoh.

2006

The 2006 version of the Champion Carnival took place between April 7 and April 20.

2007

The 2007 version of the Champion Carnival took place between March 26 and March 30.

2008

The 2008 version of the Champion Carnival took place between April 5 and April 9.

2009

The 2009 version of the Champion Carnival tournament took place between April 5 and April 12.

2010

The 2010 version of the Champion Carnival took place between April 3 and April 11.

2011

The 2011 version of the Champion Carnival tournament took place between April 8 and April 13. Kenso suffered an injury and was forced to drop out of the tournament after his first match, forfeiting the rest of his matches.

2012

The 2012 version of the Champion Carnival took place between April 21 and May 7. Yutaka Yoshie suffered an injury and was forced to forfeit the rest of his matches. Takumi Soya was injured after his fifth match and was pulled out of the tournament as well, forfeiting his final match. Jun Akiyama, the reigning Triple Crown Heavyweight Champion, did not participate due to commitments with Pro Wrestling Noah.

2013

The 2013 version of the Champion Carnival tournament took place between April 18 to April 29.

2014

The 2014 version of the Champion Carnival tournament took place between April 13 and April 27. Akebono, reigning Triple Crown Heavyweight Champion, who was leading his block at the time, was forced to pull out of the tournament on April 22 after being hospitalized with poor health, forfeiting his last two matches (The title was eventually declared vacant on May 30, after the tournament was over.) On April 25, Go Shiozaki also withdrew from the tournament due to a broken thumb, and forfeited his final match against Jun Akiyama.

2015

The 2015 version of the Champion Carnival tournament took place between April 5 and April 25.

2016

The 2016 version of the Champion Carnival tournament took place between April 9 and April 24.

2017

The 2017 version of the Champion Carnival tournament took place between April 16 and April 30.

2018

The 2018 version of the Champion Carnival tournament took place between April 7 and April 30.

2019
The 2019 version of the Champion Carnival took place between April 4 and April 29. 18 wrestlers competed in this tournament with 9 men in each block. Kengo Mashimo was originally scheduled to compete, but was forced to withdraw due to injury. Atsushi Aoki took his place.

Kento Miyahara, reigning Triple Crown Heavyweight Champion, won the tournament in his sixth consecutive appearance.

2020
The 2020 Champion Carnival was a ten-man, two-block round-robin tournament that took place from September 12 until October 5, postponed from its original dates of April as a result of the COVID-19 pandemic.

2021
The 2021 edition of the Champion Carnival took place between April 9 and May 3, 2021. For the first time since 2001, the round-robin tournament was a single table, with 10 participants. Shinjiro Otani forfeited his final 2 matches due to injury.

2022
The 2022 edition of the Champion Carnival took place between April 9 and May 4, 2022. This edition sees the return of the two-block round robin format after its absence in the 2021 edition. Twelve wrestlers will compete in this year's tournament with special guests including Big Japan Pro-Wrestling's Takuya Nomura and Gleat's T-Hawk competing in this year's tournament.

2023

The 2023 edition of the Champion Carnival took place between April 8 and May 7, 2023. Sixteen wrestlers will compete in this year's Carnival.

See also
All Japan Pro Wrestling
G1 Climax
N-1 Victory
Fire Festival
Ikkitousen Strong Climb
D-Oh Grand Prix
King of Gate

References

External links
Official tournament history at All-Japan.co.jp 

All Japan Pro Wrestling tournaments